Millbrook is a suburb and former civil parish of Southampton.  As the area developed, several settlements grew within the parish, some of them becoming parishes in their own right, thus reducing the extent of the Millbrook parish.  As well as the Millbrook of today, the original Millbrook parish included Freemantle, Regents Park, and Redbridge.  Some of these areas are still referred to as being part of Millbrook. The brook that Millbrook was named after is now known as Tanner's Brook.

History
On the 28 November 1830 in the context of the Swing riots there was a non violent protest in Millbrook and Shirley by laborers demanding increased wages.

Millbrook railway station was opened in 1861, and the parish formerly had open baths and a ferry to Marchwood.

The Church of the Holy Trinity was built between 1873 and 1880 to a design by Henry Woodyer.

John Ralfs, the notable 19th-century botanist, was born here, as were footballers Kevin Gibbens and Phil Warner who both played for Southampton F.C., along with comedian Mike Osman.

On 16 May 1925, Lucy Hodder and the English artist Harry Epworth Allen were married at Holy Trinity Church.

The old village was almost entirely destroyed by the widening of Millbrook Road.

In 1965 Milbrook towers the then tallest building in the city was built in the estate to a design by Ryder and Yates. In 1969 the Church of the Holy Trinity was given grade II listed status.

In August 2022 the Church of the Holy Trinity was put up for sale during to falling congregation numbers.

Millbrook today

Millbrook as a district is split by the A35 dual carriageway, Tebourba Way. In general, on the west are council estates, and on the east are private housing, including Regents Park and Freemantle. The estates consist of Millbrook Park, Mansel Park, Wimpson Estate, Redbridge Estate, Maybush, Brownhill and the Channel Islands Estate. There is also an industrial area close to Southampton container port, which shares a boundary with Millbrook.

The main A33 road route into the city centre from the west passes through Millbrook, effectively creating the boundary between the industrialised part of Millbrook (to the south) and the residential areas (to the north).

Millbrook is home to the Western Community Hospital and a large Tesco supermarket. There is also a small retail park with a bowling alley and two hardware stores. Along Millbrook point road, there is Goals soccer centre, a 12-pitch five-a-side football ground. There is a lot of green park land in Millbrook, hence its full title of Millbrook Park Estate, this includes Green Park, Mansel Park, Test Park, Millbrook Recreation Ground, as well as numerous school playing fields. A huge green belt cuts through the main estate, from Millbrook roundabout, to the Top Shops on Windermere Avenue.

References

External links
 

Wards of Southampton